Charlie Peace is the controversial comic novel by British writer Paul Pickering. It was published in the United States by Random House but not in the United Kingdom because of fears of Christian blasphemy prosecutions against the background of The Satanic Verses controversy.

Plot summary

Criminal Jack Peachey needs to find his own human narrative in the incredible stories  Charlie Peace told him when he was a boy. He wants to imagine a Christ in his own image.

Reception 

The book received favourable reviews in the USA. Publishers Weekly called the novel ‘A bizarre, wildly surreal fantasy that lampoons Christianity and organised religion ... makes Salvador Dali’s psychospiritual rantings look tame.’ The novel not being published in the UK led to Pickering leaving his then publishers Chatto & Windus. The row led The Sunday Times to call Pickering the ‘de facto Norman Mailer of the British literati’ and J. G. Ballard said the book was ‘very entertaining while being genuinely subversive ... not to publish it in Britain is pure censorship.’

Notes

External links
Debrett's People of Today 21 August 2005
Collected reviews
Paul Pickering at Simon & Schuster USA.
Paul Pickering at Simon & Schuster UK.
Paul Pickering's website

1991 British novels
Novels by Paul Pickering
Random House books